Aasia Bibi may refer to:

 Aasia Bibi, a woman convicted of blasphemy; see Asia Bibi blasphemy case
 Aasia Bibi, a woman who poisoned her husband's family to escape a forced marriage; see 2017 Malawat poisoning